Mituraju (possibly from Quechua mit'u, mitu mud, rahu snow, ice, mountain with snow) is a  mountain in the north of the Huayhuash mountain range in the Andes of Peru. It is located in the Ancash Region, Bolognesi Province, Pacllón District, and in the Huánuco Region, Lauricocha Province, Queropalca District. Mituraju lies southeast of Rondoy and southwest of Lake Mitucocha.

See also 

 Ninacocha
 Carhuacocha

References

Mountains of Peru
Mountains of Ancash Region
Mountains of Huánuco Region